The formal abolition of Prussia occurred on 25 February 1947, by decree of the Allied Control Council.

History

Prussia was for many centuries a major power in north-central Europe, based around the cities of Berlin and Königsberg, and rose to particular prominence during the eighteenth and nineteenth centuries.  Following its victory in the Austro-Prussian War, Prussia became the driving force in creating a German Empire that excluded Austria (a Kleindeutsches Reich) and in 1871 the King of Prussia became German Emperor.

Following the First World War, the new Free State of Prussia bore most of Germany's territorial losses but remained the dominant state of the Weimar Republic. Even before Hitler came to power, the Prussian government had been effectively abolished by the Preußenschlag of 1932. Following World War II, almost all of Germany's territorial losses were again from areas that had been part of Prussia – Eastern Prussia was partitioned between Poland and the Soviet Union.

Prussia was officially abolished by Control Council Law No. 46, passed by the Allied occupation authorities, in 1947.

This resulted in the 1954 disbanding of the Prussian Academy of Arts. In 1972, the Prussian Academy of Sciences was renamed.  It was abolished and replaced by the Berlin-Brandenburg Academy of Sciences and Humanities in 1992 as part of the process of German reunification.

Territories today 
The territories of Prussia (mainly its 12 provinces) as of 1937 eventually transformed into the following entities after the Second World War:

  City of Berlin: split in 1948 into West Berlin and East Berlin, reunified in 1990 to form the state of Berlin.
  Brandenburg: territories east of the rivers Oder and Neiße are part of Poland since 1945. The rest was a state of the GDR between 1947 and 1952. Since 1990, the state of Brandenburg exists again.
  East Prussia: today split into Poland's Warmian–Masurian Voivodeship and Russia's Kaliningrad oblast.
  Hanover: merged in 1946 with the states of Brunswick, Oldenburg and Schaumburg-Lippe to form the state of Lower Saxony.
  Hesse-Nassau: the majority of the province was merged with the People's State of Hesse to form the state of Hesse. Some western parts were merged with the Rhine Province and Bavarian Palatinate to form the state of Rhineland-Palatinate.
  Hohenzollern: merged with the southern parts of Württemberg to form the state of Württemberg-Hohenzollern in 1945. In 1952, Württemberg-Hohenzollern subsequently merged with South Baden and Württemberg-Baden into the state of Baden-Württemberg.
  Lower Silesia: the majority of the province is now part of Poland, mostly within the Lower Silesian Voivodeship. Some small parts west of the Oder-Neisse line around Görlitz are part of the state of Saxony.
  Pomerania: split by the Oder-Neisse line into Poland and Germany. The Polish part is now part of the Pomerian and West Pomeranian Voivodeships, while the German part merged with Mecklenburg to form the GDR state of Mecklenburg, which was abolished in 1952. Since 1990 the territory is part of the state of Mecklenburg-West Pomerania.
  Posen-West Prussia: today part of Poland.
  Rhineland: split in two in 1946. The northern part merged with the province of Westphalia and the Free State of Lippe to form the state of North Rhine-Westphalia, while the southern part merged with Oldenburgish Birkenfeld, the Rhenish Hesse part of the People's State of Hesse and Bavarian Palatinate to form the state of Rhineland-Palatinate.
  Saxony: The two regions around Magdeburg and Halle merged with the Free State of Anhalt to form the state of Saxony-Anhalt, which was abolished between 1952 and 1990. The region around Erfurt merged with the Weimar state of Thuringia to form the state of Thuringia, which was also abolished between 1952 and 1990. 
  Schleswig-Holstein: transformed into the state of Schleswig-Holstein.
  Upper Silesia: part of Poland, mainly as the Opole Voivodeship.
  Westphalia: merged with the northern part of the Rhine Province and the Free State of Lippe to form the state of North Rhine-Westphalia.

Law 46
Control Council Law No. 46:

The Prussian State which from early days has been a bearer of militarism and reaction in Germany has de facto ceased to exist.
Guided by the interests of preservation of peace and security of peoples and with the desire to assure further reconstruction of the political life of Germany on a democratic basis, the Control Council enacts as follows:
Article I
The Prussian State together with its central government and all its agencies are abolished.
Article II
The provisions of this Article are subject to such revision and other provisions as may be agreed upon by the Control Council, or as may be laid down in the future Constitution of Germany.
Article III
The State and administrative functions as well as the assets and liabilities of the former Prussian State will be transferred to appropriate , subject to such agreements as may be necessary and made by the Allied Control Council.
Article IV
This law becomes effective on the day of its signature.
Signed in Berlin on  February 25, 1947.
 Marie-Pierre Kœnig, Army general
 Vasily Sokolovsky, Marshal of the Soviet Union
 Lucius D. Clay, General for Joseph T. McNarney, General
 Brian Robertson, General for Sholto Douglas, Marshal of the Royal Air Force

Control Council Law No. 46, signed on 25 February, liquidates the State of Prussia, its central government, and all its agencies. This law is in the nature of a confirming action; the eleven provinces and administrative districts of prewar Prussia have since the beginning of the occupation been split up among the Soviet, British, and American Zones and Poland.

Notes

See also
Legal status of Germany
Reconstruction of Germany
Danzig Corridor
Danzig crisis
Free City of Danzig (following Free City of Danzig (Napoleonic))
Reichsgau Danzig-West Prussia

Pacts
Anglo-Polish military alliance
German–Polish Non-Aggression Pact
Molotov–Ribbentrop Pact
Soviet–Polish Non-Aggression Pact

References

Bibliography

External links
 Text of the Document
 Text of the Document 

1947 disestablishments in Germany
1947 in Germany
1947 in politics
1940s in Prussia
Allied occupation of Germany
Prussia
February 1947 events in Europe
Former subdivisions of Germany
Free State of Prussia
Legal history of Germany
Political history of Germany
Prussian law